Eddie Bierschwale (born June 29, 1959) is a former NASCAR Winston Cup driver from San Antonio, Texas. He made his Cup debut in 1983 in a car owned by his father Don. In 1985 he got a full-season ride with D.K. Ulrich and stayed with the team until the end of the 1986 season when he was let go. After bouncing from team to team in 1987 he returned to his father's team in 1988 and participated in a partial schedule with them until he retired from racing in 1992. His best Cup finish was a 10th in the 1989 Daytona 500 (he started the car, but jumped out of the car in favor of Kyle Petty, who had failed to qualify for the race in his No. 42). Bierschwale is also the driver who famously served as a relief driver for Richard Petty’s No. 43 ride in the 1992 Pepsi 400, as Petty was suffering from the effects of the hot weather in Daytona Beach, Florida that day, rendering him unable to finish. He often raced in the No. 23.

Biographical
His father Don was a funeral director who started a racing team with a co-founder. The team was B-B Racing.

Motorsports career results

NASCAR
(key) (Bold – Pole position awarded by qualifying time. Italics – Pole position earned by points standings or practice time. * – Most laps led.)

Winston Cup Series

Daytona 500

ARCA Hooters SuperCar Series
(key) (Bold – Pole position awarded by qualifying time. Italics – Pole position earned by points standings or practice time. * – Most laps led.)

References

External links
 

1959 births
Living people
NASCAR drivers
Racing drivers from San Antonio
Racing drivers from Texas
Sportspeople from San Antonio